Attorney General Howard may refer to:

John Curtois Howard (1887–1970), Attorney General of Ceylon
Jacob M. Howard (1805–1871), Attorney General of Michigan
Jeffrey R. Howard (born 1955), Attorney General of New Hampshire
Volney Howard (1809–1889), Attorney General of Texas